The 1945 Copa Aldao was the final match to decide the winner of the Copa Aldao, the 16th. edition of the international competition organised by the Argentine and Uruguayan Associations together. The final was contested by Uruguayan club Peñarol and Argentine side River Plate.

In the first match, played at Estadio Centenario in Montevideo, River Plate beat Peñarol 2–1 while in the second leg held in San Lorenzo de Almagro Stadium in Buenos Aires, River Plate beat again Peñarol 3–2 therefore achieving its fourth Copa Aldao trophy in five finals contested. Besides, striker Ángel Labruna was the most notable player of River Plate, having scored all goals for the team (5) in both matches.

Qualified teams

Venues

Match details

First leg

Second leg

References

1945 in Argentine football
1945 in Uruguayan football
Peñarol matches
Club Atlético River Plate matches
Football in Buenos Aires
Football in Montevideo